Mune may refer to:

Places
Two villages are sometimes collectively known as Mune:

Male Mune, a village in Matulji municipality, Croatia
Vele Mune, a village in Matulji municipality, Croatia

Other
Mune: Guardian of the Moon, a French animation film
 Ian Mune, New Zealander actor, director, and screenwriter

See also
Motor unit number estimation, abbreviated as MUNE